A Christmas oratorio is an oratorio written for Christmas or the Christmas season.

Christmas oratorios as a set of Christmas cantatas
Some Christmas oratorios consist of a collection of Christmas cantatas, to be performed during several days of the Christmas season. Examples include:
 Christmas Oratorio, BWV 248, Johann Sebastian Bach's , premiered from 25 December 1734 to 6 January 1735 in Leipzig.
 Liebes-Andachten, nach dem Jahrgang aus denen Evangeliis eingerichtet, cycle of Christmas cantatas by Gottfried Heinrich Stölzel, first performed 25–27 December 1719 in Gotha (music lost).
 Das Volck so im Finstern wandelt, Christmas oratorio by Gottfried Heinrich Stölzel, first performed 25–27 December 1728 in Gotha.

Ach, dass die Hülfe aus Zion über Israel käme, is a Christmas oratorio retroactively compiled from 10 cantatas by Gottfried Heinrich Stölzel, which were performed from 25 December 1736 to 6 January 1737 in Sondershausen (recorded 1999–2000).

Other examples

Christmas Story, SWV 435, by Heinrich Schütz, likely first performed in 1660, partially published in 1664.
Vom Himmel Hock, MWV A 22, by Felix Mendelssohn, written in 1831. 
Oratorio de Noël, Op. 12, by Camille Saint-Saëns, written in 1858.
A Swedish Christmas Oratorio, for 2 choirs, soprano solo and chamber orchestra, by Fredrik Sixten in 2009.

References

Christmas music
Oratorios